Robert Lee "Trey" Flowers III (born August 16, 1993) is an American football outside linebacker for the Miami Dolphins of the National Football League (NFL). He played college football at Arkansas.

Early years
Flowers attended Columbia High School in Huntsville, Alabama. He was ranked by Rivals.com as a three-star recruit. He originally committed to Georgia Tech to play college football but changed to the University of Arkansas. Flowers also played basketball in high school.

College career
Flowers played in all 13 games with three starts as a true freshman in 2011. He had 28 total tackles, 5.5 tackles, for loss and one sack. As a sophomore in 2012, he started all 13 games, recording 50 total tackles, 13 tackles for loss and six sacks. Flowers started 11 games as a junior in 2013, missing one due to injury. He finished the year with 44 total tackles, 13.5 tackles for loss and five sacks. He also recorded an interception and three forced fumbles. After his junior season, Flowers considered entering the 2014 NFL Draft and received a third-round draft grade from the NFL Draft Advisory Board, but he eventually chose to return to Arkansas for his senior year. In his last season playing for the Razorbacks he led the team in tackles for loss and sacks, respectively with 15.5 and six. He ended his career at Arkansas with 190 tackles, 47.5 tackles for loss, 18 sacks, one interception, 13 passes defended, and four forced fumbles.

Professional career

At the 2015 NFL Combine, Flowers was a top performer in the vertical and in the broad jump.

New England Patriots

2015 season
The New England Patriots selected Flowers in the fourth round (101st overall) of the 2015 NFL Draft. The pick used to draft him was acquired from the Tampa Bay Buccaneers along with tight end Tim Wright in exchange for Logan Mankins. In the first preseason game against the Green Bay Packers, Flowers sacked Aaron Rodgers but later left the game with a shoulder injury. Flowers made the Patriots 53-man roster but was only active for one game before being placed on injured reserve on December 1, 2015.

2016 season
After missing most of his rookie season due to injury, Flowers experienced a breakout season in 2016. In Week 8 against the Buffalo Bills, Flowers got his first two NFL sacks on quarterbacks Tyrod Taylor and EJ Manuel while tacking on five tackles. He played in all 16 regular season games starting in the final eight, finishing the season leading the team in sacks with 7.0, all coming in the last nine games of the season. He led the team with 2.5 sacks in the Patriots win in Super Bowl LI over the Atlanta Falcons on February 5, 2017. These included the crucial second down sack with 3:55 to go in the fourth quarter that helped push the Falcons out of field goal range, allowing the Patriots to tie the game on the following possession, completing their 25-point comeback.

2017 season
After a breakout season in 2016, Flowers began the way he ended the previous season, recording 2.0 sacks in the season opener against the Kansas City Chiefs on September 7. Despite suffering a rib injury Week 12 against the Miami Dolphins, Flowers started 14 games and led the team with 6.5 sacks. Flowers helped the Patriots reach Super Bowl LII, but the team lost 41-33 to the Philadelphia Eagles with Flowers recording 5 tackles in the Super Bowl.

2018 season
During Week 1 against the Houston Texans, Flowers had 5 tackles and 1.5 sacks. In the next game against the Jacksonville Jaguars, he forced a fumble but was later was ruled out of the game after suffering a concussion. Flowers finished the season with 57 tackles, 7.5 sacks, and 3 forced fumbles. The Patriots beat both the Los Angeles Chargers and Kansas City Chiefs to reach Super Bowl LIII where they defeated the Los Angeles Rams 13-3. Flowers had 3 tackles in the game.

Detroit Lions

2019 season
On March 14, 2019, Flowers signed a five-year, $90 million deal with the Detroit Lions. The signing reunited Flowers with former Patriots wide receiver Danny Amendola, who signed with the Lions three days earlier, alongside former defensive coordinator Matt Patricia, who became the Lions' head coach in the prior season.
In week 3 against the Philadelphia Eagles, Flowers recorded a team high 8 tackles and sacked Carson Wentz once as the Lions won 27-24. In a week 6 game on October 14, 2019, Flowers was called for two controversial and costly hands to the face penalties on Monday Night Football in a 22-23 loss to the Green Bay Packers.
In week 8 against the New York Giants, Flowers recorded a season high 2 sacks on Daniel Jones in the 31-26 win.

2020 season
In Week 1 against the Chicago Bears, Flowers recorded his first sack of the season on Mitchell Trubisky during the 27–23 loss.
In Week 6 against the Jacksonville Jaguars, Flowers recorded a strip sack on Gardner Minshew which was recovered by the Lions during the 34–16 win. Flowers was placed on injured reserve on November 2 after suffering an injury in Week 8.

2021 season
On December 4, 2021, Flowers was placed on injured reserve.

On March 16, 2022, the Lions released Flowers.

Miami Dolphins
On August 28, 2022, the Miami Dolphins signed Flowers. On October 19, 2022, Flowers was placed on injured reserve.

NFL career statistics

Regular season

Postseason

References

External links
 Arkansas Razorbacks bio

1993 births
Living people
Arkansas Razorbacks football players
American football defensive ends
Detroit Lions players
New England Patriots players
Players of American football from Alabama
Sportspeople from Huntsville, Alabama
Ed Block Courage Award recipients
Miami Dolphins players